The John Johnson House (also known as the Johnson House) is a National Historic Landmark in the Germantown section of  Philadelphia, significant for its role in the antislavery movement and the Underground Railroad.  It is located at 6306 Germantown Avenue and is a contributing property of the Colonial Germantown Historic District, which is also a National Historic Landmark. It is operated today as a museum open to the public.

History
Philadelphia, especially its Germantown section, was a center of the 19th-century American movement to abolish slavery, and the Johnson House was one of the key sites of that movement. Between 1770 and 1908, the house was the residence of five generations of the Johnson family.

The third generation was active in the Underground Railroad during the 1850s. Along with their respective spouses, Rowland, Israel, Ellwood, Sarah, and Elizabeth Johnson were members of abolitionist groups such as the American Anti-Slavery Society and the Germantown Freedman's Aid Association. Through their associations with these groups, the brothers and sisters became involved in the Underground Railroad and used their home, along with the nearby homes of relatives, to harbor fugitive slaves on their journeys to freedom. The Johnson House is a representative station on the Underground Railroad, and the Johnsons were among the leading abolitionists of their generation.

The house, then one of the largest in Germantown (then a suburb of Philadelphia), was built between 1765 and 1768 by Jacob Norr for Dirck Jansen, who owned the ground on which nearby Upsala was built. Jansen had it built for his son John Johnson, Sr.  During the 1777 Battle of Germantown, fighting occurred nearby and the house still bears marks of musket balls and cannonballs.

See also

List of Underground Railroad sites
Cliveden (Benjamin Chew House)
Germantown White House
List of National Historic Landmarks in Philadelphia
National Register of Historic Places listings in Northwest Philadelphia

References

External links

National Park Service page
NPS National Historic Landmark Listing

Johnson House Historic Site collection on the Johnson Family from Johnson House Historic Site

African-American history in Philadelphia
African-American museums in Pennsylvania
Biographical museums in Pennsylvania
Historic American Buildings Survey in Philadelphia
Historic district contributing properties in Pennsylvania
Historic house museums in Philadelphia
Houses completed in 1768
Houses on the National Register of Historic Places in Philadelphia
Houses on the Underground Railroad
National Historic Landmarks in Pennsylvania
Germantown, Philadelphia
1768 establishments in Pennsylvania
Underground Railroad in Pennsylvania